Bobtail may refer to:

 An animal with its tail bobbed
 A natural bobtail, an animal with a genetically short tail
 Donggyeongi, a Korean breed of dog
 Japanese Bobtail, a breed of cat
 American Bobtail, a breed of cat
 Kurilian Bobtail, a breed of cat
 A nickname for the Old English Sheepdog
 A bobtail lizard or skink,  species Tiliqua rugosa. 
 A bobtail squid
 A tractor unit not pulling a trailer.

Animal common name disambiguation pages